Ultramar is an Eastern Canadian gas and home fuel retailer, with its head office located in Montreal, Quebec. Ultramar operates gas stations and home fuel delivery in Ontario, Quebec, and Atlantic Canada.

History

British oil company Ultramar plc established operations in Canada in 1961. Retail stations were originally branded "Golden Eagle". Its refinery in Lévis, Quebec was built ten years later.

From 1979 to 1996, Ultramar grew by acquiring stations from several other companies, including Canadian fuel marketers Texaco Canada, Gulf Canada, Sergaz, Sunoco and Spur.

In 1981, Ultramar acquired Hanford, California-based Beacon Oil Company. It retained the name.

In 1990, it acquired the Dartmouth, Nova Scotia refinery with the purchase of other assets of Texaco Canada.

In 1991, Lasmo, a British oil company, bought Ultramar plc and in 1992 Lasmo spun off the North American refining and marketing operations which became known as Ultramar Corporation.

In 1994, Ultramar acquired Sergaz (founded in 1971 by André Ducharme) and Sunoco's Quebec gas stations. Some gas stations still operate under Sergaz but most were closed.

In 1996, Ultramar Corporation merged with Diamond Shamrock to form Ultramar Diamond Shamrock.

In 1997, the Sunoco name was withdrawn from Quebec, and all stations converted to the Ultramar brand.

The refinery in Lévis was renamed in honour of retired Ultramar Diamond Shamrock CEO Jean Gaulin in 2001.

On December 31, 2001, Valero Energy Corporation completed its acquisition of Ultramar Diamond Shamrock.

On May 1, 2013, Ultramar was spun off from Valero into CST Brands. Following the 2016 purchase of CST by Alimentation Couche-Tard, the Ultramar brand and most of CST's Canadian assets were acquired by Parkland Fuel.

Couche-Tard retained 36 Ultramar stations in Atlantic Canada. In June 2018, Couche-Tard and its partner Irving Oil announced that these stations would become Circle K locations with Irving as fuel supplier, and that 13 of them would be sold to Irving outright—with Couche-Tard operating them under a lease as with most other Irving locations.

In October 2019, Ultramar became part of Parkland's new national loyalty program Journie.

Operations

Ultramar was also active in industrial sales and wholesale supply.

Statistics
Ultramar had 983 service stations, 87 truck stop facilities and 169,000 home heating oil customers.

It directly employed 3,600 people and indirectly employed 10,000. The refinery in Lévis produced 265,000 barrels (or 41.5 million litres) per day.

References

External links

 

Oil companies of Canada
Companies based in Montreal
Automotive fuel retailers
Retail companies established in 1961
British brands
Canadian brands
Gas stations in Canada
Canadian subsidiaries of foreign companies
1991 mergers and acquisitions
1996 mergers and acquisitions
2001 mergers and acquisitions
2013 mergers and acquisitions
2016 mergers and acquisitions